Maple Park is a neighborhood of Kansas City, Missouri, United States.

A post office called Maple Park was established in 1922, and remained in operation until 1935. The neighborhood was named for the maple trees near the original town site.

References

Neighborhoods in Kansas City, Missouri